There are officially two flags of Bavaria: the striped type and the lozenge type, both of which are white and blue. Both flags are historically associated with the royal Bavarian Wittelsbach family, which ruled Bavaria from 1180 to 1918.

Overview
They may be used by civilians and by government, including using on state motor vehicles. The striped and lozenge styles have equal status, and offices or users are free to choose between them.

The variants defaced with the arms are unofficial, and the use of the symbols by civilians is strictly speaking illegal, but is tolerated. A lozenge-style flag with the arms is common.

The exact shade of blue has never been codified, but most flags used by the public are approximately RGB 0-204-255; officials use something closer to RGB 0-128-255. The lozenges are not set in number, except there must be at least 21, and the top left (incomplete) lozenge must be white.

The exact origin of the lozenges is disputed. They are believed to be representative of the lakes and rivers of Bavaria or perhaps the sky, as in the Bavarian anthem, which says "" – "the colors of His sky/heaven, white and blue".

In vexillology, flags are described and displayed from the front (obverse). In Bavaria, however, the description of the flag is based on heraldic rules. That is, the description is made from the point of view of a shield-bearer who is behind the coat of arms, and in this case, behind the flag. Thus, the right upper corner, reserved for a truncated white lozenge, is on the top left (adjacent to the flagpole) for the viewer.

Historical flags

See also
 BMW (logo based upon the flag)
 FC Bayern Munich (logo based upon the flag)
 Flags of German states

References

Bavaria
Culture of Bavaria
Bavaria